León Klimovsky (16 October 1906 – 8 April 1996) was an Argentine film director, screenwriter and film producer.

Biography

A trained dentist, born in Buenos Aires, his real passion was always the cinema. He pioneered Argentine cultural movement known as cineclub and financed the first movie theater to show art movies. He also founded Argentina's first film club in 1929.

After participating as scriptwriter and assistant director of 1944's Se abre el abismo, he filmed his first movie, an adaptation of Fyodor Dostoyevsky's The Player. He also worked on adaptations of Alexandre Dumas' The Count of Monte Cristo and Ernesto Sabato's The Tunnel.

During the 1950s, Klimovsky settled in Spain, where he became a full-time "professional" director. He directed many Spaghetti Westerns, Euro War and exploitation films, filming in Mexico, Italy, Spain and Egypt. Horror film fans best remember him for his contributions to Spain's horror film genre, beginning with La Noche de Walpurgis ("Walpurgis Night"), the film that is said to have started the Spanish horror film boom of the 1970s. Klimovsky directed famed Spanish horror icon Paul Naschy in no less than 9 films in the 1970s, while also directing other classic horror films such as "The Strange Love of the Vampires", "The Dracula Saga" and "The Vampires' Night Orgy". Naschy complimented Klimovsky's workmanlike attitude and abundant energy, but he always felt that Klimovsky rushed through many of their projects together, never allowing for sufficient retakes.

León Klimovsky always dreamt of doing great mainstream movies but ended up doing commercial exploitation films, but he had no remorse, as cinema was a vocational mandate for him. He retired from directing in 1979, at age 73.

In 1995, at age 89, he won the "Honor Award" from the Spanish Film Directors Association. He died the following year in Madrid from a heart attack. He was the brother of noted Argentinian mathematician and philosopher Gregorio Klimovsky.

Filmography
Director

 El jugador (1947)
 Se llamaba Carlos Gardel (1949)
 La guitarra de Gardel (1949)
 Marihuana (1950)
 La vida color de rosa (1951)
 Suburbio (1951)
 El pendiente (1951)
 El túnel  (1952)
 La Parda Flora (1952)
 El conde de Montecristo (1953)
 Tres citas con el destino (episode Maleficio, 1954) 
 El juramento de Lagardere (1955)
 El Tren Expreso (1955)
 La pícara molinera (1955)
 Viaje de novios (1956)
 Gli amanti del deserto, (1956)
 Miedo (1956)
 Viaje de novios (1956)
 Un indiano en Moratilla (1958)
 Llegaron los franceses (1959)
 Salto a la gloria (1959) 
 S.O.S., abuelita (1959)
 Gharam fi sahraa (Amor en el desierto, in Arabic in Egypt, 1960)
 Un bruto para Patricia (1960)
 El hombre que perdió el tren (1960)
 Ama Rosa (1960)
 La paz empieza nunca (1960)
 Un tipo de sangre (1960)
 La danza de la fortuna (1961)
 Torrejón City (1962)
 Todos eran culpables (1962)
 Horizontes de luz (1962)
 Escuela de seductoras (1962)
 Los siete bravísimos (1964)
 Ella y el miedo (1964)
 Fuera de la ley (1964)
 Escala en Tenerife (1964)
 Aquella joven de blanco (1965)
 La colina de los pequeños diablos (1965)
 Dos mil dólares por Coyote (Django... Cacciatore di taglia) (1966)
 El bordón y la estrella (1966)
 Pochi dollari per Django (Alambradas de violencia) (1966)
 A Ghentar si muore facile (1967)
 Una chica para dos (1968)
 Un hombre vino a matar (1968)
 Hora cero: Operación Rommel (L'urlo dei giganti) (with the alias Henry Mankiewicz, 1969) 
 No me importa morir (1969)
 Pagó cara su muerte (1969)
 Un dólar y una tumba (1970)
 Los hombres las prefieren viudas (1970)
 Quinto: non ammazzare (1970)
 La noche de Walpurgis (1971)
 El hombre que vino del odio (1971) 
 Reverendo Colt (1971) 
 Un dólar para Sartana 1971)
 La saga de los Drácula(1972)
 La casa de las chivas (1972)
 Dr. Jekyll y el Hombre Lobo
 La orgía nocturna de los vampiros (1973)
 La rebelión de las muertas (1973)
 El talón de Aquiles (1974)
 Odio mi cuerpo (1974)
 El mariscal del infierno (1974) 
 Una libélula para cada muerto (1974)
 Mean Mother (United States, 1974), co-directed with Al Adamson.
 Muerte de un quinqui (1975)
 Tres días de noviembre (1976)
 Secuestro (1976)
 Gritos a medianoche (1976)
 Último deseo (1976)
 ¿Y ahora qué, señor fiscal? (1977)
 El transexual (1977)
 El extraño amor de los vampiros (1977)
 Laverna (1978)
 La doble historia del Dr. Valmy (1978)
 Violación fatal (1978)
 La barraca (TV series, 1979)

Screenwriter
 Se abre el abismo (1945)
 3 millones y el amor (1946)
 Albergue de mujeres (1946)
 Siete para un secreto (1947)
 La guitarra de Gardel (1949) 
 La parda Flora (1952)
 El túnel (1952)
 El conde de Montecristo (1953)
 El Tren Expreso (1955)
 Miedo (1956)
 Un indiano en Moratilla (1958)
 S.O.S., abuelita (1959) 
 Un bruto para Patricia (1960)
 Ama Rosa (1960)
 La paz empieza nunca (1960)
 Y el cuerpo sigue aguantando (1961)
 Todos eran culpables (1962) (dialogue)
 Horizontes de luz (1962)
 Los siete bravísimos (1964)
 Escala en Tenerife (1964)
 La colina de los pequeños diablos (1965)
 Un dólar y una tumba (1970)
 Una señora llamada Andrés (1970) 
 Odio mi cuerpo (1974) 

Producer
 Rodríguez supernumerario (1948)

Assistant director
 Se abre el abismo (1944)
 Viaje sin regreso (1946)

References

External links

The artist and his paradoxes (in Spanish)

1906 births
1996 deaths
People from Buenos Aires
Argentine emigrants to Spain
Argentine film directors
Argentine Jews
Argentine people of Polish-Jewish descent
Spanish film directors
Spanish male screenwriters
Spanish film producers
Horror film directors
20th-century Spanish screenwriters
20th-century Spanish male writers